The Namibian Financial Institutions Union (Nafinu) is a trade union in Namibia, representing workers in the financial sector. It is affiliated with the National Union of Namibian Workers, the Namibian national trade union centre close to SWAPO, Namibia's ruling political party.

Further reading

References

Trade unions in Namibia
International Trade Union Confederation
Finance sector trade unions
Organisations based in Windhoek